Baro is a sub-prefecture of Guéra Region in Chad.

References 

Populated places in Chad